The Sheikh Mohammed bin Zayed Skyway (abbreviated MBZ Skyway), formerly (and still colloquially) known as the Jakarta–Cikampek Elevated Toll Road, is a  elevated expressway that extends from Cikunir, Bekasi, to Karawang in West Java, Indonesia, operated by PT Jasamarga Jalanlayang Cikampek, a subsidiary of PT Jasa Marga Tbk and PT Nusantara Infrastructure Tbk (controlled by Metro Pacific Investments) with PT Ranggi Sugiron Perkasa as minority shareholder. It passes over some sections of the existing Jakarta–Cikampek Toll Road. It is the longest flyover in Indonesia, and the longest elevated double decker expressways in Southeast Asia. The toll road was opened by President Joko Widodo on 11 December 2019 and was renamed after Mohammed bin Zayed Al Nahyan on 8 April 2021 at the behest of the President's secretary.

The elevated toll road is designed for private vehicles only. It is built to ease traffic congestion within Greater Jakarta area as well as to reduce the burden on the existing Jakarta–Cikampek toll road.

Exits

See also

List of longest bridges

References

Toll roads in Indonesia
Bridges in Indonesia
Transport in Jakarta
Transport in West Java